Darkwing (known as Dusk in the United Kingdom) is a young adult fantasy novel by Canadian author Kenneth Oppel. It is the prequel and fourth book of the Silverwing series, and takes place 65 million years before the events of the first book. It describes the origins of the war between the birds and the beasts.

Setting
Set 65 million years ago, at the very beginning of the Paleocene epoch, a huge natural disaster has wiped out most of the dinosaurs (referred to as "Saurians" within the context of the story).  A few managed to survive in the aftermath, albeit weakened by climate change, a shortage of food, and a flesh-rotting virus. The mammals, who were once at the Saurians' mercy, decide to form The Pact: unable to wage battle against them on their own terms, they decide to band together to exterminate the remaining Saurians by destroying their eggs.

Plot summary
Dusk, a young Chiropter, is being taught by his father to glide. Dusk is different from the other Chiropters, however; whereas his brethren have simple sails, Dusk has wings, and an urge to fly that he has difficulty suppressing. He is regarded as a freak by the other Chiropters, though he finds acceptance with his parents and his sister, Sylph. Dusk learns to fly, but keeps his secret to himself out of fear of being shunned.

Carnassial, the Felid (a type of proto-cat), also has a hidden desire. Born with shearing teeth and an insatiable appetite for flesh, he seemingly fulfills the pact when he destroys the last known batch of Saurian eggs. He leads a pack consisting of other flesh-craving Felids to form a new world order. The rogue pack of Felids find their way to Dusk's island and devour many of his colony, among them Dusk's mother.

With their island invaded by the deadly new predators, it is up to Dusk and his unique powers of flight and echolocation to find the Chiropters a new home. Carnassial strikes an alliance with the powerful (but unintelligent) Hyaenodons, who claim that the Saurians do still exist, and enlist the Felids to find and destroy their eggs. Carnassial comes to realize that, in order for the Felids to rule, it will have to be through cunning, rather than through power.

Along the way, Dusk and his colony seek refuge with a seemingly peaceful colony of "Tree Runners", only to find out that they plan on sacrificing them to a giant, meat-eating bird, the Diatryma. After escaping, Dusk finds a new home for his fellow Chiropters, but it is on the other side of a savannah, which is home to many predators. While Dusk is scouting for a good place, he meets another creature that looks similar to himself; it calls itself a bat and tells Dusk that there are many others like them.

The Soricids overwhelm and devour a Hyaenodon, and nearly kill Dusk, but he is rescued by Sylph. He and Sylph are attacked by Carnassial and his Hyaenodons once again, and take refuge in the skeleton of a large dinosaur. Through it, they find their way into an eerie cave, where Dusk and Sylph discover a nest of an unidentified meat-eating Saurian, along with a clutch of mostly unhatched eggs and the rotting carcasses of the parents. The Felids return and Carnassial's mate is attacked by a young dinosaur, the sibling of the eggs who'd hatched early. Carnassial fights to save his mate, but both are killed in the confrontation. The saurian chases Dusk out of the cave and attacks the Hyaenodon as the heroes flee.

Eventually, Dusk leads the Chiropters to their new home, and the book ends with him leaving the colony and promising his sister to return if he dislikes life with bats.

Characters

Chiropters
Dusk - Dusk is a young Chiropter who is considered a freak among his colony because of his ability to fly and his strange appearance. Dusk is clever and resourceful and tries his hardest to fit in with the colony. He looks up to his father, Icaron.
Sylph - Sylph is Dusk's extremely reckless twin sister, older by three seconds. She is loud, amazingly loyal and generally unaware of any possible repercussions of her actions. She does not always understand the reasoning behind her father's actions, leading to frequent arguments.
Jib - Jib is a young newborn Chiropter. He likes to show off and dislikes Dusk because of his appearance and his ability to fly. He bullies Dusk by saying that if he wasn't the leader's son, he would have been taken down to the Death Branch and abandoned there after his birth.
Aeolus - [Deceased] Aeolus is Jib's cousin, and is usually in the company of both Jib and Sylph. He was attacked and killed by birds who believed that he was Dusk, and was left to the elements on the Death Branch.
Icaron - [Deceased] Icaron is the leader of the colony and the elder of his family. His mate is Mistral and they have had many offspring, including Auster, their oldest, and Dusk and Sylph, their youngest. Icaron is kind and strong, reacting calmly in situations of panic. Icaron is accepting and is one of the only Chiropters in the colony to accept Dusk for who he is. His decisions are frequently challenged by Nova. Carnassial attacked him and gave him the wounds that brought him to his death.
Mistral - [Deceased] Mistral is the mate of Icaron and the mother of Auster, Dusk, Sylph, and many others.  A skillful hunter, it appears that Dusk inherited her echovision-like abilities from her, which Icaron had been aware of, but had cautioned Mistral not to reveal so she would not be shunned by the colony.
Auster - Auster is the eldest son of Icaron and Mistral and is one of the few to accept Dusk's unusual appearance. He has a family of his own and therefore does not interact with Dusk and Sylph's lives often until the Felids invade their island; nonetheless, he still shows concern for them when their mother dies during their escape. When their father dies, Auster does not hesitate to raise them into his family. Near the end of the book, he becomes the leader of the Chiropters.
Nova - Nova is the elder of her family. She is reckless and stubborn, and often challenges Icaron's decisions and capability to lead the colony. She takes advantage of when Dusk is away finding a new home to take more than half the colony back along the coast to find a home with other chiropters.
Sol - [Deceased] Sol is the elder of his family. He was very loyal to his leader, Icaron. While trying to protect his family, the poisonous Soricids (a prehistoric mammal similar to a shrew) paralyzed him, leading to his being killed and eaten by the little predators.
Barat - Barat is the elder of his family. He is generally level-headed, but sometimes is a little rash in his decisions. He follows Nova when she decides to abandon Dusk.
Gyrokus - Leader of a different chiropter group. He helps Icaron and his group after they escape from their island, but then banishes them from his group because of former acts of Icaron.
Chimera - A female Chiropter with an appearance similar to Dusk's. Dusk meets her while searching for a new home for his colony and is astonished to find another Chiropter who is unlike the rest. She calls herself a bat, after the leader of her colony and supposedly the first Chiropter to evolve to have flight capabilities. Chimera appears to be interested in Dusk and persuades him to join her colony and, at the end of the book, he leaves Sylph and his own colony, promising to return in the future.

Felids
Carnassial [Deceased] - Carnassial is a felid and a ferocious hunter. He destroys what is believed to have been the last of the saurians, but his taste for meat encourages him to eat the flesh of other species. This eventually leads to his expulsion from his tribe ("prowl"). Near the end, he is seen trying to rescue his mate from the jaws of a young Saurian.
Panthera - [Deceased] Panthera is Carnassial's hunting partner and mate. After she discovers a kill made by Carnassial, she keeps his secret, although he is found out, anyway. Eventually, she also discovers a taste for meat, and she joins Carnassial. She reveals to him in the Saurian cave that she is pregnant with his kittens. She is attacked by a proto-owl soon after departing from the main prowl, but is saved by Carnassial. At the end, she is pried from Carnassial by a young Saurian.
Patriofelis - [Deceased] Patriofelis is the felid leader and very old. He banishes Carnassial from his prowl and is later carried off by a proto-owl while confronting Carnassial's rogue prowl.
Miacis - [Deceased] Miacis is another strong felid who brought a group of felids to Carnassial and told him they, too, craved meat as he did. She would've been Carnassial's mate if she wasn't dead and if Panthera stayed with Patriofelis.

Others
Teryx - A bird that Dusk meets on the island.  They develop an uneasy relationship founded mostly from curiosity toward one another.  He warns Dusk of Carnassial's barbaric prowl, in spite of how the other birds hate Dusk for his ability to fly.
Danian - Leader of the hyaenodons. He is a strong leader and cares for his pack. He forms an alliance with Carnassial's prowl to team up against the saurians.
Adapis - Leader of a clan of tree runners. He is a clever tree runner, but also very selfish and underhanded. He has an unsteady alliance with a diatryma that is wounded on one of its legs, so it cannot successfully chase down prey. She must have Adapis bring her food or she will starve; in return, she protects Adapis' clan from any danger. Adapis tries feeding Icaron's group to the diatryma, but fails because of Dusk's brave actions that save many of the Chiropters. The enraged diatryma still demands a feast, and it is implied that tree runners - possibly including Adapis himself - would be offered in compensation.

Species

In Darkwing, animal species are often referred by their taxonomic clade name, rather than their own, which makes it difficult to know exactly what species each creature is. Where the species name is not known, they are listed under the name that they had in the book. The creatures are listed in the order of their appearance. The chiropters are fictional; a hypothetical species intended to represent a primitive bat.

Chiropter
Prehistoric Birds
Quetzalcoatlus (referred to as "Quetzals")
Miacis (referred to as "Felids")
Paramys
Prehistoric Owls
Alphadon
Prehistoric Primates (referred to as "Tree-runners")
Gastornis (referred to as "Diatryma")
Crocodiles (referred to as "Swamp Saurians")
Phenacodus (referred to as "Equids")
Hyaenodon
Bisonalveus browni (referred to as "Soricid")
Giant Spiders
Theropod dinosaur (referred to as "Saurian")

Note
Although it's clear from the ending that there was more to come, no further prequels, to date, have been written.

Publication history
Darkwing was first released in Canada and the United States in August 2007. It was shortly followed with its release in the United Kingdom in May 2008. Below is the release details for the first edition hardback and paperback copies in these three publication regions.

2007, CAN, HarperCollins , Pub date August 16, 2007, Hardback
2007, US, Eos , Pub date August 21, 2007, Hardback
2008, UK, Faber Children's Books , Pub date May 1, 2008, Paperback
2008, US, Eos , Pub date August 26, 2008, Paperback
2008, CAN, HarperCollins , Pub date October 17, 2008, Paperback

External links

 Darkwing Homepage

2007 Canadian novels
Canadian young adult novels
Canadian fantasy novels
Novels by Kenneth Oppel
Silverwing (series)
Novels set in prehistory
Prequel novels
HarperCollins books
Children's novels about animals
2007 children's books